The 2010 Italian Open (also known as the 2010 Rome Masters and sponsored title 2010 Internazionali BNL d'Italia) was a tennis tournament, being played on outdoor clay courts at the Foro Italico in Rome, Italy. It was the 67th edition of the event and was classified as an ATP World Tour Masters 1000 event on the 2010 ATP World Tour and a Premier 5 event on the 2010 WTA Tour. The men's event took place from April 24 to May 2, 2010 while the women's event took place from April 30 to May 8, 2010.

ATP entrants

Seeds

 Rankings are as of April 19, 2010.

Other entrants
The following players received wildcards into the main draw:
  Simone Bolelli
  Paolo Lorenzi
  Potito Starace
  Filippo Volandri

The following player received special exempt into the main draw:
  Thiemo de Bakker

The following players received entry via qualifying:
  Juan Ignacio Chela
  Santiago Giraldo
  Marcel Granollers
  Jan Hájek
  Michaël Llodra
  Peter Luczak
  Leonardo Mayer

The following player received the lucky loser spot:
  Simon Greul

Withdrawals
The following notable players withdrew from the event:
 Nikolay Davydenko (broken wrist) 
 Juan Martín del Potro (right wrist) 
 Tommy Haas (right hip surgery)
 Fernando González (knee injury)
 Ivo Karlović (achilles heel injury)
 Gaël Monfils (left wrist)
 David Nalbandian (right leg)
 Tommy Robredo (back injury)
 Andy Roddick (free exemption) 
 Gilles Simon (right knee)
 Radek Štěpánek (fatigue)

WTA entrants

Seeds

 Rankings are as of April 19, 2010.

Other entrants
The following players received wildcards into the main draw:
  Maria Elena Camerin
  Corinna Dentoni
  Romina Oprandi
  Serena Williams

The following players received entry via qualifying:
  Akgul Amanmuradova
  Gréta Arn
  Bojana Jovanovski
  Sesil Karatantcheva
  Varvara Lepchenko
  Bethanie Mattek-Sands
  Ayumi Morita
  Karolina Šprem

The following player received the lucky loser spot:
  Pauline Parmentier

Withdrawals
The following notable player withdrew from the event:
 Samantha Stosur (Fatigue, Sore Right Arm)

Finals

Men's singles

 Rafael Nadal defeated  David Ferrer, 7–5, 6–2
It was Nadal's second title of the year and 38th of his career. It was his 5th win at Rome, also winning in 2005, 2006, 2007, and 2009.
Nadal tied Andre Agassi's record of most Masters victories, 17 in total.

Women's singles

 María José Martínez Sánchez defeated  Jelena Janković, 7–6(5), 7–5
It was Martínez Sánchez' first title of the year and 3rd of her career.
Martínez Sánchez was the first Spaniard to make the final since Conchita Martínez in 1997.

Men's doubles

 Bob Bryan /  Mike Bryan defeated  John Isner /  Sam Querrey, 6–2, 6–3

Women's doubles

 Gisela Dulko /  Flavia Pennetta defeated  Nuria Llagostera Vives /  María José Martínez Sánchez, 6–4, 6–2

References

External links
Official website

 
Italian Open
Italian Open
2010 Italian Open (tennis)
April 2010 sports events in Italy
May 2010 sports events in Italy